Uhm Bok-dong  (June 20, 1892—1951?) was a Korean cyclist active during Japanese Korea.

Biography
Uhm was born on June 20, 1892, in Hanseong, Joseon.

Legacy
The Korea Cycling Federation held the National Cycle Competition, in memory of Uhm, from 1977 to 1999.

The Cultural Heritage Administration of Korea designated Uhm's bicycle as a heritage of modern Korean history.

Popular culture
 Race to Freedom: Um Bok Dong

References

1892 births
1951 deaths
South Korean male cyclists
Yeongwol Eom clan
Sportspeople from Seoul